McDonald is an unincorporated community located in Lea County, New Mexico, United States. McDonald had its own post office from May 9, 1912, until August 21, 2010; it still has its own ZIP code, 88262.

References

Unincorporated communities in Lea County, New Mexico
Unincorporated communities in New Mexico